Shadows of the West is a 1949 American Western film directed by Ray Taylor and written by Adele Buffington. The film stars Whip Wilson, Andy Clyde, Riley Hill, Reno Browne, Bill Kennedy and Pierce Lyden. The film was released on January 24, 1949, by Monogram Pictures.

Plot
Shadows of the West is a 59 minutes running time American Western film (directed by Ray Taylor; written by Adele Buffinton) released in 1949 by Monogram Pictures.

Cast              
Whip Wilson as Whip Wilson
Andy Clyde as Winks Grayson
Riley Hill as Carl Bud Davis
Reno Browne as Virginia Grayson
Bill Kennedy as B. Jonathan Ward
Pierce Lyden as Jordan 
Kenne Duncan as Bill Mayberry
Keith Richards as Steve 
William Ruhl as Sheriff Tanner 
Ted Adams as Paul Davis
Lee Phelps as Hart
Bret Hamilton as Clerk
Bud Osborne as Jones
Donald Kerr as Baker

References

External links
 

1949 films
American Western (genre) films
1949 Western (genre) films
Monogram Pictures films
Films directed by Ray Taylor
American black-and-white films
1940s English-language films
1940s American films